Heterostylum is a genus of flies belonging to the family Bombyliidae (bee-flies). There are 14 described species, distributed throughout the Americas. These are robust and very hairy flies with a body length of 10–15 mm. They can be distinguished from similar genera by an indentation in the hind margin of the eye and unique wing venation.

Larvae feed on mining bees.

Species
Heterostylum bicolor (Loew, 1861) - Neotropical: Cuba.
Heterostylum croceum Painter, 1930 - Nearctic: USA (Colorado, Kansas, Missouri, New Mexico, Texas)
Heterostylum deani Painter, 1930 - Nearctic: USA (Colorado, Kansas, Wyoming)
Heterostylum duocolor (Painter & Painter, 1974) - Neotropical: Argentina
Heterostylum engelhardti Painter, 1930 - Nearctic: USA (Arizona, California, Texas, Utah).
Heterostylum evenhuisi Cunha & Lamas, 2005 - Neotropical: Brazil: Bahia, Ceará, Goiás, Pará, Pernambuco, Rio Grande do Norte, São Paulo.
Heterostylum ferrugineum (Fabricius, 1805) - Neotropical: Bolivia, Brazil (Bahia, Ceará, Mato Grosso, Roraima, São Paulo)
Heterostylum engelhardti Painter, 1930 - Nearctic: USA (Arizona, California, Texas, Utah).
Heterostylum haemorrhoicum (Loew, 1863) - Neotropical: Cuba, Haiti.
Heterostylum helvolum Hall and Evenhuis, 1981 - Nearctic: Mexico (Sinaloa, Sonora, Tamaulipas, Zacatecas).
Heterostylum hirsutum (Thunberg, 1827) - Neotropical: Argentina, Brazil, Colombia, Paraguay, Venezuela.
Heterostylum maculipennis Cunha & Lamas, 2005 - Nearctic: Brazil: Rio de Janeiro, Santa Catarina, São Paulo
Heterostylum pallipes Bigot, 1892 - Neotropical: Haiti.
Heterostylum robustum (Osten Sacken, 1877) - Nearctic: Canada (Alberta), Mexico (Baja California, Baja California Sur, Coahuila de Zaragoza, Guerrero, Morelos, Nuevo León, Puebla, Sinaloa, Sonora, Tamaulipas), USA (Arizona, California, Colorado, Georgia, Idaho, Kansas, Nevada, New Mexico, Oklahoma, Oregon, Texas, Utah).
Heterostylum rufum (Oliver, 1789) - Neotropical: Argentina, Brazil (Acre), Guatemala, Guyana, Mexico (Tabasco), Peru, U.S. Virgin Islands.

References

Bombyliidae
Diptera of North America
Taxa named by Pierre-Justin-Marie Macquart